"You Get to Me" is a song recorded by American country music artist Eddie Rabbitt and released in 1974 as the first single from his self-titled debut album. The song was written by Rabbitt and produced by David Malloy. It was Rabbitt's first country hit, reaching number 34 on the Billboard Hot Country Singles & Tracks chart.

Critical reception
On its release as a single, Cash Box described "You Get to Me" as a "fine country rocker" and "laid-back in the great tradition". They added, "The instrumentation is very mellow, the tune is well paced and Eddie's vocal power is mellow." In a review of Eddie Rabbitt, Don Weller of the Honolulu Star-Bulletin considered "You Get to Me" as one of a few tracks to have "an easy rolling flow".

Charts

References

1974 singles
1974 songs
Eddie Rabbitt songs
Songs written by Eddie Rabbitt
Song recordings produced by David Malloy
Elektra Records singles